Eulepidotis schedoglauca is a moth of the family Erebidae first described by Harrison Gray Dyar Jr. in 1914. It is found in the Neotropics, including French Guiana.

References

Moths described in 1914
schedoglauca